The  Spokane Shock season was the seventh season for the franchise, and the third in the Arena Football League. The team was coached by Andy Olson and played their home games at Spokane Veterans Memorial Arena. The Shock finished the season 10–8, but did not qualify for the playoffs for the first time in their franchise's history.

Standings

Schedule
The Shock began the season at home against the Iowa Barnstormers on 12 March. They hosted the Tampa Bay Storm in their final regular season game on 21 July.

Roster

References

Spokane Shock
Spokane Shock seasons